The Fall were an English post-punk band from Prestwich, Greater Manchester. Formed in late 1976, the group originally featured vocalist Mark E. Smith, guitarist Martin Bramah, bassist Tony Friel and keyboardist Una Baines, with their first permanent drummer Karl Burns joining the following year. The group went through many lineup changes but remained active until Smith's death on 24 January 2018, at which point the band included bassist Dave "The Eagle" Spurr (since 2006), guitarist Peter "PP" Greenway, drummer Keiron Melling (both since 2007) and keyboardist Michael Clapham (who joined for the band's final tour in 2017).

History

1976–1982
Mark E. Smith, Martin Bramah, Tony Friel and Una Baines formed the Fall shortly after attending a Sex Pistols show at Manchester's Free Trade Hall in July 1976. The band played their first show on 23 May 1977, with Steve Ormrod playing drums for his sole appearance. The group's first permanent drummer, Karl Burns, took his place. In November the group recorded their debut EP Bingo-Master's Break-Out!, which was issued the following year. Friel left the band in December, unhappy with the recent decision to hire Kay Carroll, a friend of Smith's, as their manager.

After brief spells with Jonnie Brown and Eric McGann early in the year, 16-year-old roadie Marc Riley took over Friel's position on bass in June 1978. Baines had also left in March, following a "mental breakdown triggered in part by the druggy lifestyle she was leading". She was replaced by Yvonne Pawlett in May. The lineup of Smith, Bramah, Riley, Pawlett and Burns recorded the group's debut album Live at the Witch Trials, which was issued the following year. Burns left before the end of the year and Bramah followed in April 1979, claiming that "What initially started out as a collective became a dictatorship" dominated by frontman Smith.

Burns and Bramah were replaced by Mike Leigh and Craig Scanlon, respectively. At the time of Scanlon's arrival, Steve Hanley also joined on bass, with Riley switching to guitar. The new lineup recorded one single, "Rowche Rumble", before Pawlett also left the Fall. In an interview years later, the keyboardist claimed that she "never fitted in" with the group, leaving to study biology and breed dogs. Pawlett was not replaced, with Riley and Scanlon performing keyboards.

In March 1980, Leigh was replaced by Hanley's brother Paul on drums. The group issued Grotesque (After the Gramme) later in the year, followed by the EP Slates early the next year, featuring brief member Dave Tucker on clarinet. After replacing Paul Hanley for an American tour in the summer of 1981, due to the former being under the age of 21, Karl Burns rejoined the Fall in October 1981 to mark the start of the band's first two-drummer lineup. This incarnation issued two studio albums in 1982, Hex Enduction Hour and Room to Live, before Riley was sacked after a physical altercation with Smith, playing his final Fall show in December.

1982–1995

After several months with just one guitarist, the Fall added Brix Smith in the summer of 1983 after she married frontman Mark E. Smith in July, just three months since they first met. She debuted on two tracks on the 1983 album Perverted by Language, which was followed by The Wonderful and Frightening World Of... the next year. In November, shortly after the latter's release, Paul Hanley left the Fall to form Kiss the Blade, and the following month, his brother Steve Hanley went on paternity leave and was temporarily replaced by Simon Rogers. After a four-month absence, Hanley returned and Rogers joined officially on keyboards and guitar.

By early 1986, Karl Burns had left the Fall for a second time, with Simon Wolstencroft taking his place. Before Wolstencroft's arrival, however, Paul Hanley briefly returned to record two tracks for Bend Sinister, as well as the single "Living Too Late". Shortly after the release of Bend Sinister, Rogers left the group to focus on his production work, which he continued to do with the Fall for several years. With new keyboardist Marcia Schofield, the band released The Frenz Experiment and I Am Kurious Oranj in 1988, as well as a string of commercially successful singles including "There's a Ghost in My House", "Hit the North" and "Victoria".

In July 1989, it was announced that Brix Smith had left the Fall, with original guitarist Martin Bramah returning in her place. It was revealed later that the outgoing member and Mark E. Smith had divorced earlier that year. Bramah performed on Extricate and remained until July 1990, when both he and Schofield (who by that time were dating each other) were fired from the band. Following the pair's departure, keyboards were handled primarily by Wolstencroft, as well as by violinist Kenny Brady, who joined at the same time. Dave Bush, who initially joined the Fall crew as a roadie, took over as the band's new keyboardist in August 1991.

After the release of Code: Selfish and The Infotainment Scan, Karl Burns returned for a second two-drummer lineup in May 1993. He left again just a few months later, but returned in time for a North American tour in August. After the release of Middle Class Revolt, Brix Smith also returned in August 1994, claiming she had "started to miss the artistic freedom that [she] had" in the group. After the band recorded Cerebral Caustic, Bush was replaced by Julia Nagle.

1995–2000
After the band spent much of the year touring, long-time guitarist Craig Scanlon was dismissed from the Fall in late 1995. In later interviews, Mark E. Smith claimed that Scanlon's sacking after 16 years in the band was due to his "slovenly appearance" and "failure to maintain [his] amps", although he later changed his explanation by suggesting that the guitarist had been "trying to play jazz or Sonic Youth-style stuff over good simple songs that he'd written himself". It has been strongly suggested that Smith regretted his decision, and Scanlon himself said he was invited to re-join the group by Smith several years later, but declined. The Light User Syndrome was issued in 1996. Brix Smith left in October, following an argument with Mark E. Smith at a show in October. Karl Burns followed in December.

Adrian Flanagan took over as the Fall guitarist in December 1996, followed by Tommy Crooks the following May (when Burns also rejoined). The group continued touring until April 1998, when all but Smith and Nagle left the band following two shows in the United States which ended in fighting between band members. Before the planned final show in New York, Smith was arrested after allegedly assaulting Nagle, his girlfriend at the time, which resulted in the show's cancellation. A few weeks later, Smith and Nagle returned for three more shows in the UK, joined by temporary drummer Kate Themen.

After several months off, the Fall returned in August 1998 with new bassist Karen Leatham and drummer Tom Head, the latter of whom took over from Themen who was originally hired on a full-time basis after her first three shows. By the following January, Neville Wilding was the band's new guitarist and Leatham had been replaced by Adam Helal, with both new members joining officially after performing on The Marshall Suite as session musicians. Head was briefly sacked ahead of the 1999 Reading Festival, with Nick Dewey taking his place for the show, before he was reinstated the following day in time for the Leeds date.

2000–2018

Shortly after the release of The Unutterable in November 2000, Tom Head was replaced by Spencer Birtwistle. By February the next year, Neville Wilding and Adam Helal had also been replaced, by Birtwistle's Trigger Happy bandmates Ben Pritchard and Jim Watts, respectively. By August, keyboardist and guitarist Julia Nagle had left the Fall after six years with the band. Brian Fanning briefly took over the vacated role of second guitarist, but by October had left again, shortly before Birtwistle was replaced by Dave Milner on drums. Milner was another former member of Trigger Happy featuring Pritchard, Watts and the Fall's manager Ed Blaney.

In September 2002, the Fall played one show with two new keyboardists – Smith's girlfriend Elena Poulou alongside Ruth Daniel. Retaining only Poulou on a full-time basis, the group issued The Real New Fall LP (Formerly Country on the Click) in 2003. Watts was fired that March and replaced by Simon "Ding" Archer the next month. After just a year with the band, Archer left the following April and was replaced by Steve Trafford. In July 2004, Watts returned on guitar and Birtwistle returned on drums. By December, the former had left for a second time, crediting concerns over credits and royalties, as well as a lack of creative input in the band.

The Fall's lineup changed dramatically again in May 2005, after Pritchard, Trafford and Birtwistle all left the band suddenly following a show in the US. The trio were quickly replaced by Tim Presley, Rob Barbato (both members of American group Darker My Love) and Orpheo McCord, respectively. Later in the year, guitarist Peter Greenway, bassist Dave Spurr and drummer Keiron Melling all debuted with the Fall, due to the new members' differing schedules. After the release of Reformation Post TLC (featuring Greenway and Spurr), the three new additions became full-time members upon the departure of Presley, Barbato and McCord in June 2007.

For almost ten years the Fall's lineup remained stable, making it the longest-standing incarnation of the band's history. Daren Garratt of the Nightingales joined as a second drummer between 2013 and 2015, featuring on The Remainderer, Sub-Lingual Tablet and Wise Ol' Man. Paul Bonney of the Australian Pink Floyd Show took over for tour dates in 2016. The lineup came to an end with the departure of long-time keyboardist Elena Poulou in 2016, after her divorce from Mark E. Smith. Keyboards on the band's final studio album New Facts Emerge were recorded by Greenway (synthesisers) and Spurr (mellotron), before Mike Clapham joined for the final touring cycle in 2017.

On 24 January 2018, Smith died of lung and kidney cancer, marking the end of the Fall.

Members

Final members

Former members

Other contributors

Timeline

Lineups

References

Footnotes

External links
The Fall official website

Fall, The